The LIV Golf Invitational Chicago is a professional golf tournament held at Rich Harvest Farms in Sugar Grove, Illinois, outside of Chicago.

The inaugural event was held in September 2022 as part of the LIV Golf Invitational Series, a golf series led by Greg Norman and funded by the Saudi Arabian Public Investment Fund. The 48-player field featured several former major championship including Phil Mickelson, Dustin Johnson, Brooks Koepka, Bryson DeChambeau, Charl Schwartzel, Patrick Reed and Sergio García, and was won by 2022 Open champion Cameron Smith.

Format
The tournament was a 54-hole individual stroke play event, with a team element. Four-man teams were announced on the Monday before the tournament, with a set number of their total scores counting for the team on each day. Each round commenced with a shotgun start, with the leaders beginning on the first hole for the final round, in order to finish on the eighteenth.

Inaugural field
48 golfers participated in the inaugural LIV Chicago event.

Abraham Ancer
Richard Bland
Laurie Canter
Paul Casey
Eugenio Chacarra
Bryson DeChambeau (c)
Sergio García (c)
Talor Gooch
Branden Grace
Sam Horsfield
Charles Howell III
Dustin Johnson (c)
Matt Jones
Sadom Kaewkanjana
Martin Kaymer (c)
Phachara Khongwatmai
Sihwan Kim
Brooks Koepka (c)
Chase Koepka
Jason Kokrak
Anirban Lahiri
Marc Leishman
Graeme McDowell
Phil Mickelson (c)
Jediah Morgan
Kevin Na (c)
Joaquín Niemann
Shaun Norris
Louis Oosthuizen (c)
Wade Ormsby (c)
Carlos Ortiz
Pat Perez
Turk Pettit
James Piot
David Puig
Ian Poulter
Patrick Reed
Charl Schwartzel
Cameron Smith
Henrik Stenson
Hudson Swafford (c)
Cameron Tringale
Peter Uihlein
Harold Varner III
Scott Vincent
Lee Westwood
Bernd Wiesberger
Matthew Wolff

Teams
4 Aces GC: Johnson (c), Gooch, Perez, Reed
Cleeks GC: Kaymer (c), McDowell, Canter, Bland
Crusher GC: DeChambeau (c), Casey, Howell III, Lahiri
Fireball GC: García (c), Ancer, Ortiz, Chacarra
HY Flyers GC: Mickelson (c), Wiesberger, Wolff, Tringale
Iron Heads GC: Na (c), Kaewkanjana, Khongwatmai, Kim
Majesticks GC: Westwood (c), Stenson, Poulter, Horsfield
Niblicks GC: Swafford, Piot, Pettit, Varner III
Punch GC: Ormsby, Jones, Leishman, Smith
Smash GC: B. Koepka (c), C. Koepka, Kokrak, Uihlein
Stinger GC: Oosthuizen (c), Schwartzel, Grace, Norris
Torque GC: Niemann, Vincent, Puig, Morgan

Winners

Individual

Team

Notes

References

Chicago
Golf in Illinois
September 2022 sports events in the United States